Aborted is a Belgian death metal band formed in 1995 in Waregem. The group currently consists of vocalist, founder and only constant member Sven de Caluwé, guitarist Ian Jekelis, bassist Stefano Franceschini and drummer Ken Bedene. Although the band originally had an entire lineup of members living in Belgium, Aborted's current lineup now features members from Belgium, The Netherlands, Iceland and the United States. The band has released eleven studio albums, six EPs and one live DVD.

AllMusic stated that Aborted "had grown into the role of key contributors to the 'brutal death metal' genre" and described the band's style as "unrestrained grindcore savagery and meticulously crafted death metal technicality".

History

Aborted was founded by vocalist Sven de Caluwé in 1995 in the city Waregem. The band initially featured an all-Belgian lineup, which consisted of de Caluwé, bassist Koen Verstraete, drummer Steven Logie and guitarists Niek Verstraete and Christophe Herreman. According to de Caluwé, the band was named "Aborted" in hopes that the band's CDs could be found on the racks in music stores as the very first selections in the "A" section. Short years after forming, the band released a demotape titled The Necrotorous Chronicles. Following early recordings and some live shows, the band were eventually signed to Uxicon Records. Since then the band has released three splits (on Soulreaper Records, Bones Brigade, and Listenable Records, respectively), eight full-length albums, five EPs, and a DVD. Aborted are currently signed to Century Media Records. According to Allmusic, Aborted "had grown into the role of key contributors to the death-grind genres".

The band released the Coronary Reconstruction EP on 14 January 2010.

On 28 March 2011, de Caluwé announced that recording for Aborted's seventh studio album, Global Flatline would begin in June. The album is reported to contain fifteen tracks. Global Flatline was produced by Jacob Hansen, who previously worked with Aborted on 2003's Goremageddon: The Saw and the Carnage Done and 2004's The Haematobic EP.

On 20 June 2011, the band entered Hansen Studios in Denmark with Hansen to record Global Flatline. On 9 July 2011, it was confirmed that recording for Global Flatline has been completed. Confirmed guest vocalists on the album include Julien Truchan of Benighted, Keijo Niinimaa of Rotten Sound and Jason Netherton of Misery Index. Global Flatline was released in January 2012. A digital single of the title track was released on 25 October 2011.

On 29 April 2014, The Necrotic Manifesto was released through Century Media and charted in the USA (Heatseeker charts spot 4), The Netherlands, Germany, Belgium and France.

On 9 November 2015, Aborted has announced their new 20th anniversary EP Termination Redux to release on 8 January 2016 and a tour date to perform in Europe along with Kataklysm and Septicflesh. On 12 February 2016, the band announced to release their latest full-length album Retrogore on 22 April 2016. On 26 March 2018, the band announced the release of their new album, TerrorVision, produced by Kristian "Kohle" Kohlmannslehner, which released on 21 September 2018.

Band members

Current members
 Sven "Svencho" de Caluwé – vocals (1995–present)
 Ken Bedene – drums (2010–present)
 Ian Jekelis – guitars (2015–present)
 Stefano Franceschini – bass (2016–present)
 Dan Konradsson – guitars (2022–present)

Live members
 Etienne Gallo – drums (2006)
 Nicolas Bastos – drums (2007)
 Kevin Verlay – bass (2011–2012)
 Josh Neale – bass (2012)

Former members

 Koen Verstraete – bass (1997–2002)
 Steven Logie – drums (1997–1998)
 Niek Verstraete – guitars (1997–2002)
 Frank Rousseau – drums (1998–2003)
 Christophe "Herre" Herreman – guitars (1998–2000)
 Thijs "Tace" de Cloedt – guitars (2000–2006)
 Frederic "Fre" Vanmassenhove – bass (2002–2006)
 Bart Vergaert – guitars (2002–2005)
 Dirk Verbeuren – drums (2003–2004, 2009)
 Gilles Delecroix – drums (2004–2006)
 Olivia "Raziel" Scemama – bass (2005–2006)
 Stephane Souteyrand – guitars (2005–2006)
 Sebastian "Seb Purulator" Tuvi – guitars, backing vocals (2005–2009)
 Peter Gomaere – bass (2006–2007) guitars (2007–2009)
 Matty Dupont – guitars (2006–2007)
 Sven "Svenchini" Janssens – bass (2007–2009)
 Daniel Wilding – drums (2007–2009)
 Cole Martinez – bass (2009)
 JB van der Wal – bass (2009–2011, 2012–2016)
 Eran Segal – guitars (2009–2012)
 Ken Sorceron – guitars (2009–2011)
 Michael Wilson – guitars (2011–2012)
 Mendel bij de Leij – guitars (2012–2019)
 Danny Tunker – guitars (2012–2015)
 Harrison Patuto – guitars (2019–2021)

Discography

Studio albums
 The Purity of Perversion (1999)
 Engineering the Dead (2001)
 Goremageddon: The Saw and the Carnage Done (2003)
 The Archaic Abattoir (2005)
 Slaughter & Apparatus: A Methodical Overture (2007)
 Strychnine.213 (2008)
 Global Flatline (2012)
 The Necrotic Manifesto (2014)
 Retrogore (2016)
 TerrorVision (2018)
 ManiaCult (2021)

Extended plays
 The Haematobic EP (2004)
 Coronary Reconstruction (2010)
 Scriptures of the Dead (2014)
 Termination Redux (2016)
 Bathos (2017)
 La Grande Mascarade (2020)

DVDs
 The Auricular Chronicles (Listenable, 2006)

Demo tapes
 The Necrotorous Chronicles (Esophagus, 1997)

Splits
 Eructations of Carnal Artistry (split CD with Christ Denied, 2000)
 Created to Kill (4-way split CD with Misery Index, Brodequin and Drowning, 2002)
 Deceased in the East/Extirpated Live Emanations (live split 10" record with Exhumed, 2003)

References

External links 

Belgian death metal musical groups
Musical groups established in 1995
Century Media Records artists
Musical quintets
Listenable Records artists
Belgian grindcore musical groups